Sharukhiyeh (also Romanized as Shārūkhīyeh; also known as Shāhrokhīyeh) is a village in Buzi Rural District, in the Central District of Shadegan County, Khuzestan Province, Iran. At the 2006 census, its population was 68, in 13 families.

References 

Populated places in Shadegan County